The 2012–13 season of the Turkish Women's First Football League is the 17th season of Turkey's premier women's football league. Konak Belediyespor is the champion of the season

Teams

League table

Results

External links
 Kadınlar 1. Ligi 2012 - 2013 Sezonu 

2012
2012–13 domestic women's association football leagues
Women's